Gamasellus puberulus is a species of mite in the family Ologamasidae.

References

puberulus
Articles created by Qbugbot
Animals described in 1982